Reginald George Caryer (28 September 1895 – 7 June 1957) was an English cricketer.  Caryer was a right-handed batsman who bowled right-arm medium-fast.  He was born at Hougham, Kent.

Caryer made a single first-class appearance for Sussex against Essex at the County Ground, Leyton in the 1922 County Championship.  In Sussex's first-innings, he was dismissed for 5 runs by Jack Russell, while in their second-innings he was dismissed by Laurie Eastman for 7 runs.  Essex won the match by 127 runs.  This was his only major appearance for Sussex.

He later played for Berkshire in the Minor Counties Championship, making his debut against Oxfordshire in 1928.  He played Minor counties cricket for Berkshire infrequently until 1935, making a total of twelve appearances.  He died at Reading, Berkshire on 7 June 1957.

References

External links
Reginald Caryer at ESPNcricinfo
Reginald Caryer at CricketArchive

1895 births
1957 deaths
People from Dover District
English cricketers
Sussex cricketers
Berkshire cricketers